Pinehurst is a neighborhood in the Northgate area of Seattle, Washington, United States. It is bounded by NE 145th Street to the north, NE Northgate Way to the south, I-5 to the west, and Lake City Way to the east.  These boundaries were determined by the Pinehurst Community Council. Pinehurst's northern boundary of NE 145th Street makes Pinehurst one of the northernmost neighborhoods in the city of Seattle.

Pinehurst has two neighborhood parks, Pinehurst Playfield and Pinehurst Pocket Park, and the neighborhood is bounded on the north by Jackson Park and Thornton Creek Park #1.  Pinehurst is also the home to a model natural drainage system, the Pinehurst Green Grid.

References

External links

Pinehurst Seattle neighborhood blog

Neighborhoods in Seattle